Joseph Henry Rodriguez (born December 12, 1930) is a senior United States district judge of the United States District Court for the District of New Jersey.

Education and career
Born in Camden, New Jersey, to Mario, a survivor of the 1918 sinking of the passenger liner SS Carolina, and Carmen Martinez Chapel Rodriguez, Rodriguez received an Artium Baccalaureus degree from La Salle University in 1955 and a Bachelor of Laws from Rutgers School of Law–Camden in 1958. He was in private practice in Camden from 1959 to 1982. He was the Chairman of New Jersey State Board of Higher Education from 1971 to 1973, and of the State Commission of Investigation from 1974 to 1979. He was a public advocate/public defender, for the State of New Jersey from 1982 to 1985.

Federal judicial service
On February 28, 1985, Rodriguez was nominated by President Ronald Reagan to a new seat on the United States District Court for the District of New Jersey created by 98 Stat. 333. He was confirmed by the United States Senate on May 3, 1985, and received his commission on May 10, 1985. He assumed senior status on May 22, 1998.  In 2007, Rodriguez wrote for a unanimous panel of the United States Court of Appeals for the Third Circuit when it held that challengers had no standing to bring claims of racially exclusionary zoning.

See also
List of Hispanic/Latino American jurists
List of first minority male lawyers and judges in New Jersey

References

Sources
 

1930 births
Living people
20th-century American judges
21st-century American judges
Hispanic and Latino American judges
Judges of the United States District Court for the District of New Jersey
People from Camden, New Jersey
Public defenders
Rutgers University alumni
United States district court judges appointed by Ronald Reagan